Revalsche Zeitung was a daily German language newspaper published in Tallinn, Estonia. The first editor-in-chief was Friedrich Nikolai Russow, who served in the post until 1863. The paper was published until 1914. It was restarted in 1930 and ceased publication in 1940.

The newspaper was published under other names in the 20th century. During various periods it was called Revaler Bote, Revalsches Tageblatt, Revaler Zeitung, Estländische Zeitung, Ostsee-Zeitung.

Editors 
1860–1867 Wilhelm Greiffenhagen
1860–1862 
1865 
1865–1867 Wilhelm Warbandt
1867–1869 
1869–1870 Friedrich Bienemann (:de)
1870–1873 Wilhelm Warbandt
1871–1878 Eugen Heubel
1878–1914 Christoph Mickwitz (:et)
1879–1881 Wilhelm Warbandt
1905–1908 Paul Schiemann
1908–1914 Theodor Jürgens, Max Koch 
1914 Adolf von Keussler
1930–1933 Axel de Vries
1933–1937 Reinhold Hasselblatt
1937–1938 Ewert Krusenstjern
1938–1939 Axel de Vries
1940 Heinrich von Neff, Hans Otto von zur Mühlen

References

Defunct newspapers published in Estonia
German-language newspapers published in Europe
Mass media in Tallinn
Newspapers published in Estonia
Publications established in 1860
Publications disestablished in 1940